Norman Davidson (25 October 1934 – 20 November 2022) was a Scottish footballer who played as a centre-forward.

Career
Davidson was born in Kintore, Aberdeenshire, and after a period as a teenager with Chelsea which did not result in any senior appearances, returned home and started his career with local junior club, Inverurie Loco Works.

Six months after signing for Aberdeen, he made his professional debut in October 1955, and went on to make 146 appearances for the club in major competitions, including the 1959 Scottish Cup Final, but moved to Heart of Midlothian in early 1961. While with the Tynecastle club he befriended Willie Hamilton, who provided the cross for Davidson to score the winning goal in the 1962 Scottish League Cup Final (he had also found the net in the previous year's event which resulted in defeat).

Davidson joined Dundee United in October 1963 for a £4,000 transfer fee, but soon left to join Partick Thistle in January 1964, having been swapped for Partick's George Smith. He later played for St Mirren and English non-League clubs Margate and Ramsgate, and had a spell in South Africa. After retiring, he worked at a bus depot in Edinburgh for many years.

On 21 November 2022, it was announced that Davidson had died, at the age of 88.

References

External links 

1934 births
2022 deaths
People from Garioch
Scottish footballers
Footballers from Aberdeenshire
Association football forwards
Chelsea F.C. players
Fraserburgh F.C. players
Aberdeen F.C. players
Heart of Midlothian F.C. players
Dundee United F.C. players
Partick Thistle F.C. players
St Mirren F.C. players
Scottish Football League players
Margate F.C. players
Ramsgate F.C. players
Inverurie Loco Works F.C. players
Scottish Junior Football Association players
Scottish expatriate footballers
Scottish expatriate sportspeople in South Africa
Expatriate soccer players in South Africa